The Medico-Botanical Society of London (or the Royal Medico-Botanical Society of London) was a society founded in 1821 by John Frost, as director, for the avowed purpose of "investigating, by means of communications, lectures, and experiments, the medicinal properties of plants ... of promoting the study of the vegetable materia medica of all countries ... and of cultivating medical plants." The Society's meetings were held at 32, Sackville Street. The first president was William George Maton, MD, FRS. His successors as president were Robert Bree, MD, FRS, the surgeon Sir James McGrigor, FRS, and Philip Henry Stanhope, 4th Earl Stanhope, FRS.

In 1830 the Society abolished its office of Director and expelled John Frost because of his unpopular, presumptuous conduct and displays of vanity.

The Transactions of the Royal Medico-Botanical Society of London were issued in three parts covering three intervals: 1821 to 1829; 1832 to 1833; and 1834 to 1837.

The 4th Earl Stanhope was one of the main supporters of the Society, and it ceased to exist soon after his death in 1855.

References

Medical associations based in the United Kingdom
Defunct clubs and societies of the United Kingdom
1821 establishments in England
1855 disestablishments in England